Charles Curtis (January 25, 1860 – February 8, 1936) was an American attorney and Republican politician from Kansas who served as the 31st vice president of the United States from 1929 to 1933 under Herbert Hoover. He had served as the Senate Majority Leader from 1924 to 1929. A member of the Kaw Nation born in the Kansas Territory, Curtis was the first Native American and first person with acknowledged non-European ancestry to reach either of the highest offices in the federal executive branch.

Based on his personal experience, Curtis believed that Indians could benefit from mainstream education and assimilation. He entered political life when he was 32 years old and won several terms from his district in Topeka, Kansas, beginning in 1892 as a Republican to the U.S. House of Representatives. There, he sponsored and helped pass the Curtis Act of 1898, which extended the Dawes Act to the Five Civilized Tribes of Indian Territory. Implementation of the Act completed the ending of tribal land titles in Indian Territory and prepared the larger territory to be admitted as the State of Oklahoma, which occurred in 1907. The government tried to encourage Indians to accept individual citizenship and lands and to take up European-American culture.

Curtis was elected to the U.S. Senate first by the Kansas Legislature in 1906 and then by popular vote in 1914, 1920, and 1926. Curtis served one six-year term from 1907 to 1913 and then most of three terms from 1915 to 1929, when he was elected as vice-president. His long popularity and connections in Kansas and federal politics helped make Curtis a strong leader in the Senate. He marshaled support to be elected as Republican Whip from 1915 to 1924 and then as Senate Majority Leader from 1924 to 1929. In those positions, he was instrumental in managing legislation and in accomplishing Republican national goals.

Curtis ran for vice president alongside Herbert Hoover for president in 1928—winning a landslide victory. In 1932, he became the first United States vice president to have ever opened the Olympic Games. However, when Curtis and Hoover ran together again in 1932 during the Great Depression, they lost as the public gave the Democrats Franklin D. Roosevelt and John Nance Garner a landslide victory that year. Curtis remains the highest-ranking enrolled Native American who ever served in the federal government. He is also the most recent officer of the executive branch to have been born in a territory, rather than a state or federal district. He remained the only mixed race vice president in American history until the inauguration of Kamala Harris in 2021.

Early life and education 
Born on January 25, 1860, in North Topeka, Kansas Territory, a year before Kansas was admitted as a state, Charles Curtis had three-eighths Native American ancestry and five-eighths European American ancestry. His mother, Ellen Papin (also spelled Pappan), was Kaw, Osage, Potawatomi, and French. His father, Orren Curtis, was of English, Scots, and Welsh ancestry. On his mother's side, Curtis was a descendant of chief White Plume of the Kaw Nation and chief Pawhuska of the Osage.

Curtis's first words as an infant were in French and Kansa, both languages that he learned from his mother. She died in 1863, when he was 3 years old, but he lived for some time thereafter with his maternal grandparents on the Kaw reservation and returned to them in later years. He learned to love racing horses and was later a highly-successful jockey in prairie horse races.

After Curtis's mother died in 1863, his father remarried but soon divorced. During his Civil War service, Orren Curtis was captured and imprisoned. During that period, the toddler Charles was cared for by his maternal grandparents. They also later helped him gain possession of his mother's land in North Topeka; under the Kaw matrilineal system, he inherited it from her. His father tried unsuccessfully to get control of that land. Orren Curtis married a third time and had a daughter, Theresa Permelia "Dolly" Curtis, who was born in 1866, after the end of the war.

On June 1, 1868, 100 Cheyenne warriors invaded the Kaw Reservation. The Kaw men painted their faces, donned regalia, and rode out on horseback to confront the Cheyenne. The rival Indian warriors put on a display of superb horsemanship, accompanied with war cries and volleys of bullets and arrows. Terrified white settlers took refuge in nearby Council Grove. After about four hours, the Cheyenne retired with a few stolen horses and a peace offering of coffee and sugar from the Council Grove merchants. No one had been injured on either side. During the battle, Joe Jim, a Kaw interpreter, galloped  to Topeka to seek assistance from the governor. Riding with Jim was the eight-year-old Charles Curtis, then nicknamed "Indian Charley."

Curtis re-enrolled in the Kaw Nation, which had been removed from Kansas to Indian Territory when he was in his teens. Curtis was strongly influenced by both sets of grandparents. After living on the reservation with his maternal grandparents, M. Papin and Julie Gonville, he returned to the city of Topeka. There, he lived with his paternal grandparents while he attended Topeka High School. Both grandmothers encouraged his education.

Curtis read law in an established firm, where he worked part time. He was admitted to the bar in 1881 and began his practice in Topeka. He served as prosecuting attorney of Shawnee County, Kansas, from 1885 to 1889.

Marriage and family 
On November 27, 1884, Curtis married Annie Elizabeth Baird (1860–1924). They had three children: Permelia Jeannette Curtis (1886–1955), Henry "Harry" King Curtis (1890–1946), and Leona Virginia Curtis (1892–1965). He and his wife also provided a home in Topeka for his paternal sister Dolly Curtis before her marriage. His wife died in 1924.

A widower when he was elected vice president in 1928, Curtis had his long-since-married sister, Dolly Curtis Gann (March 1866 – January 30, 1953), act as his official hostess for social events. She had lived with her husband, Edward Everett Gann, in Washington, DC, since about 1903. He was a lawyer and once an assistant attorney general in the government. Attuned to social protocol, Dolly Gann insisted in 1929 on being treated officially as the second woman in government at social functions. The diplomatic corps voted to change a State Department protocol to acknowledge that while her brother was in office.

To date, Curtis is the last vice president who was unmarried during his entire time in office. Alben W. Barkley, who served as vice president from 1949 to 1953, entered office as a widower but remarried while in office.

House of Representatives (1893–1907) 
First elected as a Republican to the House of Representatives of the 53rd Congress, Curtis was re-elected for the following six terms. Naturally gregarious, he also made the effort to learn about his many constituents and treated them as personal friends.

In 1902, the Kaw Allotment Act disbanded the Kaw Nation as a legal entity and provided for the allotment of its communal land to members in a process similar to that experienced by other tribes. The act transferred 160 acres (0.6 km2) of former tribal land to the federal government. Other land that hand held in common was allocated to individual tribal members. Under the terms of the act, as enrolled tribal members, Curtis and his three children were allotted about 1,625 acres (6.6 km2) of Kaw land near Washunga in Oklahoma.

Curtis served several consecutive terms in the House from March 4, 1893, to January 28, 1907.

Senate (1907–1913, 1915–1929) 

Curtis resigned from the House after he had been elected by the Kansas Legislature to the U.S. Senate seat that was left vacant by the resignation of Joseph R. Burton. Curtis served the remainder of his current term, which ended on March 4, 1907. (Popular election of U.S. senators had not yet been mandated by constitutional amendment.) At the same time, the legislature elected Curtis to the next full Senate term. From March 4, 1907, he served until March 3, 1913. In 1912, Democrats won control of the Kansas legislature and so Curtis was not re-elected.

The 17th Amendment, providing for direct popular election of Senators, was adopted in 1913. In 1914, Curtis was elected to Kansas's other Senate seat by popular vote and was re-elected in 1920 and 1926. In total, he served from March 4, 1915, to March 3, 1929, when he resigned to become vice president.

During his tenure in the Senate, Curtis was President pro tempore, Chairman of the Committee on Expenditures in the Department of the Interior, of the Committee on Indian Depredations, and of the Committee on Coast Defenses; and Chairman of the Republican Senate Conference. He also was elected for a decade as Senate Minority Whip and for four years as Senate Majority Leader after Republicans won control of the chamber. He had experience in all the senior leadership positions in the Senate and was highly respected for his ability to work with members on both sides of the aisle.

In 1923, Curtis, together with his fellow Kansan Representative Daniel Read Anthony, Jr., proposed the first version of the Equal Rights Amendment to the U.S. Constitution to each of their Houses. The amendment did not pass.

Curtis's leadership abilities were demonstrated by his election as Republican Whip from 1915 to 1924 and Majority Leader from 1925 to 1929. He was effective in collaboration and moving legislation forward in the Senate. Idaho Senator William Borah acclaimed Curtis as "a great reconciler, a walking political encyclopedia and one of the best political poker players in America." Time magazine featured him on the cover in December 1926 and reported that "it is in the party caucuses, in the committee rooms, in the cloakrooms that he patches up troubles, puts through legislation" as one of the two leading senators, the other being Reed Smoot.

Curtis was remembered for not making many speeches and was noted for keeping the "best card index of the state ever made." Curtis used a black notebook and later a card index to record all the people who he met in office or while he was campaigning. He continually referred to it, which resulted in his being known for "his remarkable memory for faces and names:"

Curtis was celebrated as a "stand patter," the most regular of Republicans but also as a man who could always bargain with his party's progressives and with Senators from across the aisle.

Vice presidency (1929–1933) 
Curtis received 64 votes on the presidential ballot at the 1928 Republican National Convention in Kansas City out of 1,084 total. The winning candidate, Herbert Hoover, secured 837 votes and had been the favorite for the nomination since August 1927, when President Calvin Coolidge took himself out of contention. Curtis was a leader of the anti-Hoover movement and formed an alliance with two of his Senate colleagues, Guy Goff and James E. Watson, as well as Governor Frank Lowden of Illinois. Hoover's pedigree as a progressive follower of Theodore Roosevelt did not sit well with conservatives like Curtis. Less than a week before the convention, he described Hoover as a man "for whom the party will be on the defensive from the day he is named until the close of the polls on election day." However, Curtis had no qualms about accepting the vice-presidential nomination.

Although Hoover gave few speeches during the 1928 presidential campaign, Curtis traveled coast to coast and spoke almost every day. While covering the convention, H. L. Mencken described Curtis as "the Kansas comic character, who is half Indian and half windmill. Charlie ran against Hoover with great energy, and let fly some very embarrassing truths about him. But when the Hoover managers threw Charlie the Vice-Presidency as a solatium, he shut up instantly, and a few days later he was hymning his late bugaboo as the greatest statesman since Pericles."

The Hoover–Curtis ticket won the 1928 presidential election in a landslide by receiving 444 out of the 531 Electoral College votes and 58.2% of the popular vote. Curtis resigned from the Senate the day before he was sworn in as vice-president. After he took the oath of office in the Senate Chamber, the presidential party proceeded to the East Portico of the U.S. Capitol for Hoover's inauguration. Curtis arranged for a Native American jazz band to perform at the inauguration.

Curtis's election as vice president made history because he was the only native Kansan, the only Native American, and the first person of color to hold the post. The first person enrolled in a Native American tribe to be elected to such a high office, Curtis decorated his office with Native American artifacts and posed for pictures wearing Indian headdresses. He was 69 years old when he took office, which made him the oldest incoming vice-president at the time.

Curtis was the first vice-president to take the oath of office on a Bible in the same manner as the President. Curtis named Lola M. Williams as private secretary to the vice-president, and Williams was one of the first women to enter the Senate floor, which was traditionally a male monopoly.

Soon after the Great Depression began, Curtis endorsed the five-day work week with no reduction in wages as a work-sharing solution to unemployment. In October 1930, in the middle of the campaign for 1930 midterm elections, Curtis made an offhand remark that "good times are just around the corner". The statement was later erroneously attributed to Hoover and became a "lethal political boomerang.".

At the 1932 Republican National Convention, Hoover was renominated almost unanimously. Curtis failed to secure a majority of votes on the first ballot for the vice-presidential nomination. He received 559.25 out of 1,154 votes (or 48.5%), with Generals Hanford MacNider (15.8%) and James Harbord (14.0%) being his nearest contenders. On the second ballot, the Pennsylvania delegation shifted its votes to Curtis from Edward Martin, which gave him 634.25 votes (54.9%) and secured him the nomination for the second time.

Curtis opened the 1932 Summer Olympics in Los Angeles and so became the first U.S. executive branch officer to open the Olympic Games.

Curtis cast three tie-breaking votes in the Senate.

Following the stock market crash in 1929, the problems of the Great Depression deepened during the Hoover administration and resulted in the defeat of the Republican ticket in 1932. The Democrat Franklin D. Roosevelt was elected in 1932 as president, with a popular vote of 57% to 40%. Curtis's term as vice president ended on March 4, 1933. Curtis's final duty as vice president was to administer the oath of office to his successor, John Nance Garner, whose swearing-in ceremony was the last to take place in the Senate Chamber.

Post-vice presidency (1933–1936) 

Curtis decided to stay in Washington, DC, to resume his legal career, as he had a wide network of professional contacts from his long career in Congress and the executive branch. He participated in one of the earliest known triathlons in the city. He died there from a heart attack on February 8, 1936, at the age of 76. By his wishes, his body was returned to Kansas and buried next to his wife at the Topeka Cemetery.

Legacy and honors 
 He was the only United States vice-president to inaugurate the Olympic games
 He was featured on the cover of Time magazine on December 20, 1926 and June 18, 1928, while serving as U.S. Senator from Kansas. Full-length articles discussed his life and politics.
He was featured as vice president on the cover of Time on December 5, 1932.
 His house in Topeka, Kansas has been listed on the National Register of Historic Places and designated as a state historic site. The Charles Curtis House Museum is now operated as a house museum.
 He was the only multiracial person to serve as Vice President of the United States until the inauguration of Kamala Harris in 2021.

See also 
 Curtis Act of 1898
 List of Chairpersons of the College Republicans
 List of people on the cover of Time Magazine: 1920s – December 20, 1926, and June 18, 1928
 List of people on the cover of Time Magazine: 1930s – December 5, 1932
 List of Native Americans in the United States Congress

References

Sources

Further reading

External links 

 "Charles Curtis; Native-American Indian Vice-President; a biography" , Vice President Charles Curtis Website
 Whispers Like Thunder, Moro Films official movie web site
 Don C. Seitz, From Kaw Teepee to Capitol; The Life Story of Charles Curtis, Indian, Who Has Risen to High Estate, full text, Hathi Trust Digital Library
 Charles Curtis House Museum , official website
 
 
 "Charley Curtis: From Teepee to Capitol Dome" by Deb Goodrich
 Image of Vice-President Charles Curtis at a banquet on-board a military ship, Los Angeles (?), 1932. Los Angeles Times Photographic Archive (Collection 1429). UCLA Library Special Collections, Charles E. Young Research Library, University of California, Los Angeles.

1860 births
1936 deaths
19th-century Native Americans
19th-century American politicians
1928 United States vice-presidential candidates
1932 United States vice-presidential candidates
20th-century vice presidents of the United States
20th-century Native Americans
American people of French descent
American people of English descent
American people of Osage descent
American people of Potawatomi descent
American people of Scottish descent
American people of Welsh descent
American prosecutors
Hoover administration cabinet members
Kansas lawyers
Kaw people
Lawyers from Washington, D.C.
Native American Christians
Native American lawyers
Native American candidates for Vice President of the United States
Native American members of the United States Congress
American lawyers admitted to the practice of law by reading law
Politicians from Topeka, Kansas
Republican Party (United States) vice presidential nominees
Presidents pro tempore of the United States Senate
Republican Party members of the United States House of Representatives from Kansas
Republican Party United States senators from Kansas
Republican Party vice presidents of the United States
Vice presidents of the United States
Washington, D.C., Republicans
People buried in Topeka Cemetery